Aubrey Robinson may refer to:

 Aubrey Eugene Robinson Jr., United States federal judge
 Aubrey Robinson (Hawaii planter), Hawaiian island owner